The yellow-billed shrike (Corvinella corvina) is a large passerine bird in the shrike family. It is sometimes known as the long-tailed shrike, but this is to be discouraged, since it invites confusion with the long-tailed shrike, Lanius schach, of tropical southern Asia. The yellow-billed shrike is a common resident breeding bird in tropical Africa from Senegal eastwards to Uganda and locally in westernmost Kenya. It frequents forest and other habitats with trees.

Description
The adult has mottled brown upperparts and streaked buff underparts. It has a brown eye mask and a rufous wing patch, and the bill is yellow. Sexes are largely similar, but females have maroon patches on the flanks, while males have rufous parches; these patches are only visible when the bird is in flight, displaying, engaging in territorial disputes, or preening. Immature birds show buff fringes to the wing feathers. The legs and feet are black, and the beak is yellow, even in juveniles. It is a noisy bird, with harsh swee-swee and dreee-too calls.

Distribution
The species is resident in tropical Africa, south of the Sahara and north of the equator, but is not present in the Horn of Africa. It is present in Benin, Burkina Faso, Cameroon, Central African Republic, Chad, Congo, the Democratic Republic of Congo, Côte d'Ivoire, Gambia, Ghana, Guinea, Guinea-Bissau, Kenya, Mali, Mauritania, Niger, Nigeria, Senegal, Sierra Leone, South Sudan, Sudan, Togo, and Uganda. It makes localised movements, but these have been little studied.

Ecology
This is a conspicuous and gregarious bird and a cooperative breeder, always seen in groups, often lined up on telephone wires. The nest is a cup structure in a bush or tree into which four or five eggs are laid. Only one female in a group breeds at a given time, with other members providing protection and food.

The yellow-billed shrike feeds on insects, which it locates from prominent look-out perches in trees, wires, or posts. They also sometimes eat small frogs, reptiles, and mice, but are not known to eat other birds or to form larders.

Status
C. corvina is common in some areas and less so in others. No evidence has been found of any substantial decline in its populations, so the International Union for Conservation of Nature has assessed its conservation status as being of least concern.

References

Cited books

Further reading

 Birds of The Gambia by Barlow, Wacher and Disley, 
 

yellow-billed shrike
Birds of Sub-Saharan Africa
yellow-billed shrike
Taxobox binomials not recognized by IUCN